Holsworthy railway station is located on the East Hills line, serving the Sydney suburb of Holsworthy. It is served by Sydney Trains T8 Airport & South line services.

History
Holsworthy station opened on 21 December 1987 when the East Hills line was extended from East Hills to Glenfield.

Platforms & services

Transport links
Transdev NSW operate three routes to and from Holsworthy station:
901: to Westfield Liverpool
902: to Liverpool station
902X: Sandy Point to Liverpool station

References

External links
holsworthy line 
Holsworthy station details Transport for New South Wales

Easy Access railway stations in Sydney
Railway stations in Sydney
Railway stations in Australia opened in 1987
East Hills railway line
City of Liverpool (New South Wales)